Tennessee Cove is an embankment off the Pacific Ocean in Marin County, California. It is named after the S.S. Tennessee, a steamship that ran aground near here on March 6, 1853. All 550 passengers climbed safely onto the beach, and fourteen chests of gold were salvaged before the ship broke up. Remnants of the ship can still be seen during low tide during some winter days on the south end of the beach.

The cove is a  hike from the parking lot near the end of Tennessee Valley Road.

Landmarks
On December 29, 2012, the landmark arch at Tennessee Cove collapsed. The landmark had been a popular photography subject over the years.

Gallery

References

Bays of California
Coves of the United States
Bays of Marin County, California
Landforms of the San Francisco Bay Area
History of Marin County, California
West Marin